Michel "Micha" Gaillard (1957 – January 14, 2010) was a Haitian politician and university professor.

Political role
He was a major voice of opposition against the 2004 coup d'état which ousted President Jean-Bertrand Aristide. In 2005, he helped found the Fusion of Haitian Social Democrats political party.

2010 earthquake
Gaillard was killed in the 2010 Haiti earthquake. He was attending a meeting at the Ministry of Justice when the quake struck. He survived the initial disaster but died of his injuries a day and a half later, at roughly 4:15am on January 14.

See also
Casualties of the 2010 Haiti earthquake

References

2010 deaths
Haitian academics
Victims of the 2010 Haiti earthquake
Fusion of Haitian Social Democrats politicians
1957 births